

Evangelical Lutheran Church in America
The Evangelical Lutheran Church in America (ELCA) has seven seminaries:

Lutheran School of Theology at Chicago
Lutheran Theological Southern Seminary: merged with Lenoir–Rhyne University
Luther Seminary
Pacific Lutheran Theological Seminary
Trinity Lutheran Seminary: merged with Capital University
United Lutheran Seminary
Wartburg Theological Seminary

In addition, the ELCA sponsors the following seminary education programs, which are not on the campus of an ELCA seminary:
Lutheran Seminary Program in the Southwest  (Austin, Texas)
Lutheran Theological Center in Atlanta (Georgia)

Evangelical Lutheran Church in Canada
The Evangelical Lutheran Church in Canada has two seminaries:

Lutheran Theological Seminary, Saskatoon
Martin Luther University College

Lutheran Church–Canada
The Lutheran Church–Canada has two seminaries:

Concordia Lutheran Seminary
Concordia Lutheran Theological Seminary

Lutheran Church–Missouri Synod
The Lutheran Church–Missouri Synod (LCMS) has two seminaries:

Concordia Seminary
Concordia Theological Seminary

Other Lutheran bodies
American Lutheran Theological Seminary of the American Association of Lutheran Churches
Association Free Lutheran Bible School and Seminary of the Association of Free Lutheran Congregations
Bethany Lutheran Theological Seminary of the Evangelical Lutheran Synod
Immanuel Lutheran College of the Church of the Lutheran Confession.
Institute of Lutheran Theology, independent pan-Lutheran serving the Augsburg Lutheran Churches, the Canadian Association of Lutheran Congregations, the Lutheran Congregations in Mission for Christ, and the North American Lutheran Church
Lutheran Brethren Seminary of the Church of the Lutheran Brethren of America
North American Lutheran Seminary of the North American Lutheran Church
Walther Theological Seminary of the United Lutheran Mission Association
Wisconsin Lutheran Seminary of the Wisconsin Evangelical Lutheran Synod

Other institutions with Lutheran Studies programs
Cross-Cultural Ministry Center hosted at Concordia University Irvine (LCMS) for the Lutheran Congregations in Mission for Christ
Faith Evangelical Seminary (non-denominational) serving the Conservative Lutheran Association and the Lutheran Congregations in Mission for Christ
Gordon–Conwell Theological Seminary (non-denominational) serving the Lutheran Congregations in Mission for Christ
Sioux Falls Seminary (North American Baptist Conference) serving the Lutheran Congregations in Mission for Christ

References

Lutheran
 North America
Lutheran